Belle-Rivière is an unorganized territory in the Canadian province of Quebec, located in the regional county municipality of Lac-Saint-Jean-Est. It had a population of 10 in the Canada 2021 Census, and covered a land area of 608.47 km2. The Métabetchouane River forms its western boundary.

The territory is named after la Belle Rivière ("the beautiful river") that has its source at Lac de la Belle Rivière ("Beautiful River Lake") that is also within the territory. The river was historically an important route for the natives and explorers of the Lac Saint-Jean region.

See also
 List of unorganized territories in Quebec

References

Unorganized territories in Saguenay–Lac-Saint-Jean